This article presents the statues to be found on the Great West Front of Salisbury Cathedral, in Salisbury, England. It names all the statues and their dates of installation, sculptors where known, and the attributes and identifying features of the statues. There are photographs of the statues with an enumerated photograph to show their position on the façade.



Statues
There are 79 figures on the Great West Front.
 7 are from the 14th century, of which two were modified in the mid-18th century.
 63 were installed between 1867 and around 1871 from the workshops of James Redfern.
 5 were installed in the 20th century.
 4 were installed in the 21st century.

Display scheme
The overall scheme is divided into six tiers. The niche numbering system works from left to right (north to south) as viewed from the west, and from top to bottom. The four lower tiers begin on the north face of the north turret and continue around onto the south face of the south turret; only the lower two tiers have statues on the north face.

Tier 1: The Vesica

Tier 2: The Angels

Tier 3: Old Testament Patriarchs and Prophets

Tier 4: Apostles

Tier 5: Doctors, Virgins and Martyrs

Tier 6: Worthies belonging to the English Church, many with a local connection

References

Statuary of the West Front
Gothic sculptures
19th-century sculptures
Architectural sculpture
Outdoor sculptures in England
Salisbury-related lists